Narita may refer to:

Places
 Narita, Chiba, a city in Japan
 Narita International Airport, main international airport serving the Greater Tokyo Area
 Narita-san, temple in the city
 Narita Line
 Narita Station
 Narita, Illinois, an unincorporated community in the United States

People with the surname
, Japanese speed skater
 Ken Narita, voice actor
 , Japanese basketball player
 Mayumi Narita, Japanese Paralympic swimmer
, Japanese golfer
 Ryo Narita, model and actor
 Ryōgo Narita, novelist
 Tohl Narita, visual artist

People with the given name
 Narita Takaki, footballer

Other uses
 Narita (album)
 Narita (Nader), a character in Ice Blade

See also
 Narita Brian, a racehorse
Naruto

Japanese-language surnames